Khaspari is a village in Amawan block of Rae Bareli district, Uttar Pradesh, India. It is located 4 km from Raebareli, the district headquarters. As of 2011, its population is 1, in 1 household. It has no schools and no healthcare facilities.

The 1961 census recorded Khaspari as comprising 1 hamlet, with a total population of 620 people (303 male and 312 female), in 134 households and 127 physical houses. The area of the village was given as 240 acres.

The 1981 census recorded Khaspari as being uninhabited and having an area of 95.91 hectares.

References

Villages in Raebareli district